The Cow Neck Peninsula is a peninsula in Nassau County, New York, on the North Shore of Long Island.

Description 
The Cow Neck Peninsula was named Cow Neck in the 17th century, in large part due to the fact that it served as a common pasture at the time. The Cow Neck Peninsula is famous for its affluence and historic communities, and was famous for its sand mines along Hempstead Harbor throughout the 20th century. 

It is believed that 90% of the concrete that built the foundations of New York City came from the Port Washington sand mines, and that over 100 million tons of sand were shipped to Manhattan.

The Cow Neck Peninsula is also known as Manhasset Neck or simply as Cow Neck.

Geography 
On its west side, the Cow Neck Peninsula is bordered by Manhasset Bay. On its east side, it is bordered by Hempstead Harbor. To the north, it is bordered by the Long Island Sound.

Some places on the Cow Neck Peninsula – notably in Flower Hill and Manhasset – reach elevations high enough for the skyline of New York City to be seen from ground level.

List of communities 

The following towns are located on the Cow Neck Peninsula – either in part or in whole:
 Baxter Estates
 Flower Hill
 Manhasset
 Manorhaven
 Plandome
 Plandome Heights
 Plandome Manor
 Port Washington
 Port Washington North
 Sands Point

Additionally, the Cow Neck Peninsula is located entirely within the Town of North Hempstead.

References 

Landforms of Nassau County, New York